Panagiotis Angelopoulos (alternate spellings: Panayiotis, Aggelopoulos) (Greek: Παναγιώτης Αγγελόπουλος) is a Greek businessman and an oil shipping and steel magnate. He is the co-owner of the men's professional Greek Basket League and EuroLeague club basketball team Olympiacos, along with his brother, Giorgos Angelopoulos.

Angelopoulos family
Angelopoulos is the son of the Greek oil shipping and steel magnate, Constantine Angelopoulos, and the grandson of the late Greek industrialist, Panagiotis Angelopoulos (1909–2001). He is also the nephew of Theodore Angelopoulos. He is the brother of Giorgos Angelopoulos.

Businesses
Angelopoulos, along with his brother Giorgos, is the co-owner of Arcadia Shipmanagement.

Olympiacos B.C.
Panagiotis Angelopoulos, and his brother, Giorgos, won the EuroLeague Club Executive of the Year Award in the year 2012, after their professional basketball club, Olympiacos, won the EuroLeague 2011–12 season's championship.

References

External links
Olympiacos B.C. Official Website Profile

Living people
1973 births
Greek basketball chairmen and investors
Greek basketball executives and administrators
Greek businesspeople
Olympiacos B.C. presidents